"You Should Hear How She Talks About You" is a song performed by American singer Melissa Manchester from her album Hey Ricky.

Overview
First recorded by Charlie Dore for her 1981 Listen! album, "You Should Hear How She Talks About You" was written by Dean Pitchford and Tom Snow. According to lyricist Pitchford, the song's lyrical concept was borrowed from "She Loves You" by the Beatles: "the idea of somebody reporting to somebody else on hearing this girl's in love with you, or this boy's in love with you." Pitchford and Snow had had that idea in mind for some time; then when Snow first played for Pitchford a new tune which had come to him, Pitchford felt: "this [could] be the song where we write our modern day 'She Loves You.'" Pitchford came up with the main hook line as "You should hear the way she talks about you" which Snow amended to "You should hear how she talks about you".

Arif Mardin who produced Manchester's recording described the track as "a real departure for Melissa because it has a new wave dance quality and she had been known for her ballads", Manchester having reached the top ten of the Billboard Hot 100 with the ballads "Midnight Blue" (#6) and "Don't Cry Out Loud" (#10) and the previous Manchester/Mardin collaboration "Through the Eyes of Love" also being a ballad. Mardin continued: "But music is music. You can't turn your back on new formats or styles." A 1985 interview with Manchester would state that the singer "had to be dragged kicking and screaming into [the] studio to record...'You Should Hear How She Talks About You'."

The track would earn Manchester the Grammy Award for Best Female Pop Vocal Performance for the year 1982, besting nominated performances by superstars Linda Ronstadt and Olivia Newton-John as well as Juice Newton and Laura Branigan. Manchester had previously been nominated in that category for her 1979 Top 10 hit "Don't Cry Out Loud."

In a 2012 interview Manchester would say of "You Should Hear How She Talks About You": "What was wonderful was that the song was written by two colleagues of mine, Tom Snow and Dean Pitchford. It's a solid song; but it was not the norm for me because I’m basically a troubadour. But I cut my hair off, lost lots of weight, glammed up, and ran it up the flagpole - and it worked! It worked all the way to a Grammy, which was kind of surprising. It was a lot of fun. I stopped singing it for awhile, because I needed a little perspective on it. But now I sing it again, and it’s kinda fun."

Personnel
Melissa Manchester – lead vocals
Robbie Buchanan – synthesizers, rhythm arrangements
Larry Williams – alto saxophone
Steve Lukather – guitar
Abe Laboriel Sr. – bass guitar
Jeff Porcaro – drums
Millie Whiteside, Ula Hedwig, Will Lee – background vocals

Chart performance
"You Should Hear How She Talks About You" reached #5 on the U.S. Billboard Hot 100 in September 1982 to become Manchester's highest charting record. On the Cash Box chart, it spent six weeks at #4. The success enabled the song to rank at #18 on the Hot 100's year-end chart for 1982. The song would also prove to be Manchester's last Top 40 hit (her 1983 single "Nice Girls" would peak at #42).  Also, it peaked at #10 on the Adult Contemporary chart  and #8 on the dance chart.  "You Should Hear How She Talks About You" was also a worldwide hit in Canada (#5), New Zealand (#20), and Australia (#4). In Australia, it ranked as the #25 single of 1982.

Weekly charts

Year-end charts

References

External links
 

1982 singles
Melissa Manchester songs
Songs written by Dean Pitchford
Songs written by Tom Snow
1981 songs
Arista Records singles
Song recordings produced by Arif Mardin
Grammy Award for Best Female Pop Vocal Performance